Kingdoms of Amalur: Reckoning is a 2012 action role-playing game developed by Big Huge Games, and published by 38 Studios and Electronic Arts for Windows, PlayStation 3 and Xbox 360. Two expansion packs were released that same year. Reckoning follows the story of the Fateless One, a resurrected person freed from the Fate Weave which binds all of Amalur's people. The Fateless One ends up fighting the rogue Fae Gadflow and his god Tirnoch, who seek to destroy the mortal races. Gameplay has the Fateless One exploring the open world of Amalur, completing quests and fighting a variety of enemies both in the open world and in dungeons. The playstyle is customized through a combination of weapons types, skill trees, and passive enhancements dubbed Destinies.

Production of Reckoning began in 2009 based on the Amalur setting created by 38 Studios founder Curt Schilling and writer R. A. Salvatore for their in-development MMORPG Project Copernicus. Based on a reworked game prototype created prior to 38 Studios acquiring Big Huge Games, Reckoning was intended to introduce the Amalur universe, but was otherwise developed as a standalone project. Several notable figures contributed to the game's design including artist Todd McFarlane, designer Ken Rolston, and composer Grant Kirkhope. While Reckoning was praised by critics for its gameplay design and graphics, and it sold above expectations for a new intellectual property, the closure of 38 Studios and Big Huge Games led to the cancellation of a sequel.

A remastered version subtitled Re-Reckoning was released in 2020 for Windows, PlayStation 4 and Xbox One. A Nintendo Switch port and a third expansion Fatesworn were released in 2021. The remaster and expansion were developed by Kaiko and published by THQ Nordic, which had acquired the Amalur intellectual property. Re-Reckoning featured adjustments to the gameplay balance and incorporated all previous DLC features. The release saw mixed reviews due to technical issues which were addressed in patches, and the ageing of mechanics considered innovative at release.

Gameplay

Kingdoms of Amalur: Reckoning is a action role-playing game in which players, taking on the role of the Fateless One, explore the fantasy world of the Faelands. The Fateless One's gender, appearance, and race (the human Almain and Varani groups, and the Alfar Ljosalfar and Dokkalfar tribes) are customised at the start. Each race has unique boosts to different attributes, with further passive enhancements through choosing a patron deity. Navigation is limited to the player walking or running through open areas and dungeon environments, with specific platforms for contextual jumps to lower areas, and the ability to swim through deep water. Players complete a variety of quests related to the main scenario, self-contained quest lines for groups dubbed Factions, non-repeatable side quests, and repeatable Tasks all available from non-playable characters (NPCs) found through the world's five regions. Completing quests, discovering regions of the world and completing some in-game activities reward experience points which raises the character's level and statistics.

The real-time combat focuses on the player using their two equipped weapons, and equippable active skills unlocked through skill trees and activated through the players magic point (MP) meter. Available weapons include two sword types, two types of daggers, bows, hammers, and chakrams. The player can also block with a shield accessory with an enemy being stunned with correct timing, or dodge to avoid attacks. Some movement abilities are tied to specific character Abilities. Combat is based around button timing, with different combinations triggering alternate attacks and more attack options unlocking as the player's level increases. Enemies are locked to a specific level range when entering an area of the world. During combat, an energy called Fate is rewarded if the player uses a varied range of attacks. With a full Fate metre, the player can trigger "Reckoning" mode, which slows down time for everyone except the player for as long as the metre has Fate energy. An enemy down to low health can be killed through a cinematic attack, with the player able to mash a button to gain an experience boost. All enemies also in low health will also die. Enemies drop in-game currency and randomised loot including weapons, crafting materials and items such as potions. If the player runs out of health, the Fateless One dies and they must restart from a previous save.

Character customization focuses on skills and enhancements unlocked through three Ability trees (melee-focused Might, stealth-based Finesse, magic-focused Sorcery), equipment and weapons, and tarot cards called Destinies. Destinies function as a character class system, with different ones unlocked as points are placed in different Ability trees and granting passive enhancements to character statistics or combat abilities. Completing Faction questlines and story sections unlock Twists of Fate, permanent Destinies granting additional passive enhancements. The character's Skill and Ability points can be reset at any point using characters in the world dubbed Fateweavers, who will undo the current character build for a fee.

Outside combat, the player has nine different passive Skills which can be increased using points gained from leveling up. These are not combat related, instead tying into the player's abilities outside of combat such as crafting or talking to NPCs. These are Lockpicking, which allows the player to unlock chests and doors around the world; Blacksmithing, easing the forging and salvaging of weapons and armor; Dispelling, which eases the player's ability to remove magical wards from some chests; Detect Hidden which uncovers hidden item caches and reveals more landmarks on the local map; Persuasion, which can unlock additional dialogue options for some NPC conversations; Sagecraft, used to create gems to enhance weapons and armour; Alchemy, which increases the success and complexity of potion making; Mercantile, which influences selling and buying prices with in-game merchants; and Stealth which eases the player's ability to sneak around enemies and detect traps. Alongside this the player can acquire houses with access to storage for excess items.

Synopsis

Setting and characters
Reckoning is set within the world of Amalur; the game's events take place across the Faelands, a land separated into two distinct territories by a great river. All things in the Faelands follow a destined path dictated by the Fate Weave, which can be read and reported by gifted individuals dubbed Fateweavers. The current age is referred to as the "Age of Arcana", a time when unknown magic is beginning to manifest.

Native to the Faelands are the immortal Fae of the Summer and Winter Courts, respectively representing new life and decay. Recent arrivals are the mortal races including two tribes of humans, the Ljosalfar and Dokkalfar tribes of the Alfar, and gnomes. By the game's opening, the mortal races and Summer Fae are threatened by the Tuatha Deohn, a hostile faction of the Winter Fae worshipping the god Tirnoch who are destined to wipe out all life in the Faelands and spread through Amalur.

The main protagonist is the Fateless One, a dead person brought back by the Well of Souls−a gnome-made device intended to revive the dead−and consequently severed from the Fate Weave and suffering from amnesia. They are revived and aided by the gnome Fomorous Hughes, creator of the Well of Souls. They later ally with Agarth, a warrior-turned-Fateweaver who uses drink to cope with knowledge of his death; Alyn Shir, a Dokkalfar assassin and diplomat who knew the Fateless One; and Tilera ap Gwydion, a disillusioned Ljosalfar general leading the mortal resistance against the Tuatha Deohn and their leader Gadflow.

Plot
The Fateless One is revived by the Well of Souls, which is then attacked by the Tuatha Deohn. Hughes distracts the attackers to allow the Fateless One to escape, directing them to find Agarth. Disbelieving the Fateless One's lack of destiny, Agarth eventually brings them to a Fateweaver temple to find a Fae codex recording all of Amalur's history. Once there, the Fateless One prevents Agarth's fated death, and meets with Alyn Shir. The codex, decoded by the Summer Fae's king, reveals the Fateless One's role in changing Amalur's destined destruction. The Fateless One then helps Agarth root out Tuatha Deohn agents working against them while reuniting with Hughes, and at Alyn's suggestion helps Tilera retrieve an ancestral weapon and prepare to launch an attack on a besieged city in the Winter Fae's lands. The Fateless One, Agarth, Hughes and Alyn accompany Tilera on a successful assault to break the siege, though Tilera dies in the process.

Allying with surviving friendly Winter Fae, the Fateless One tracks down a former ally, the gnome researcher Ventrinio, who helps the group secure a route into the Winter Fae stronghold Alabastra. The Fateless One's allies launch an assault on Alabastra, though Alyn kills Ventrinio as he grows obsessed with the source of Gadflow's power. Alyn reveals the Fateless One and she were part of a secret order guarding the prison of Tirnoch, a rogue Fae turned into a dragon who now seeks to escape her prison and destroy Amalur. As they near her prison, Tirnoch reveals she revived the Fateless One to free her. The Fateless One confronts Tirnoch, who kills Gadflow as he has fulfilled his purpose. The Fateless One defeats Tirnoch, allowing Alyn to rescue them and re-seal the prison, leaving a letter warning to keep Tirnoch a secret from Amalur. Agarth also reveals he can no longer see people's futures, hinting that Amalur's future is no longer predetermined.

The story is added to through expansion packs. In Legend of Dead Kel, the Fateless One is trapped on the island of Gallows End, which is controlled by the notorious pirate Dead Kel. Dead Kel was unwillingly saved from death by the island's god-like sentient tree Akara, who now wants the Fateless One to undo its mistake. The Fateless One successfully defeats Dead Kel, inheriting Akara's power and taking control of Gallows End. In Teeth of Naros, the Fateless One goes to the titular isolated land of the Kollossae, a stone-like people who were left demoralised after a tragic misuse of the Hyperian, a magic-amplifying artefact. Their current leader Anokatos seeks to atone by destroying the city. Allying with guard captain Secandra, the Fateless One defeats Anokatos and his followers, returning the Hyperian to the Kollossae.

Development
Reckoning began as a game prototype created by Rise of Nations developer Big Huge Games in 2007, alternately known under the codenames "Crucible" and "Ascension". It was a mutliplatform release for PlayStation 3 (PS3), Xbox 360 (360) and Windows. Mark Nelson acted as creative director, whose previous work included Titan Quest and entries in the The Elder Scrolls series. In different interviews, the game's design was attributed to Nelson, veteran game designer Ken Rolston, and later lead designer Ian Frazier. Rolston was later described as "executive design director" for the game. During its prototyping phase, Nelson and Rolston wanted to blend different game genres, with RPG mechanics and real-time strategy elements and the large-scale battles of Dynasty Warriors. Realising they could not get those systems to work together, they focused on the RPG elements. The game's ambition coupled with financial troubles almost led to original publisher THQ shutting down the studio, before Big Huge Games were sold on to 38 Studios who took over as publisher and project manager.

Founded in 2006 as Green Monster Games, 38 Studios had been created by Curt Schilling, a former baseball pitcher and avid gamer. Working with writer R. A. Salvatore and artist Todd McFarlane, Schilling had created the fantasy setting of Amalur for an MMORPG dubbed Project Copernicus. The prototype was reworked into a game using the Amalur universe, drawing its characters and events from the lore created for Project Copernicus, being developed under the codename "Mercury". 38 Studios was co-publisher with Electronic Arts under the EA Partners program. A later report estimated the production budget at $30 million, with over $28 million being advanced by Electronic Arts to help with development. In a production postmortem, executive producer Mike Fridley noted that Electronic Arts offered a range of development support and provided much feedback during production.

Production of the final version began in May 2009, with Frazier feeling the team were given greater creative freedom under their new employers. While the technical and gameplay elements were carried over intact from the prototype, all other elements were rebuilt from scratch to match the Amalur universe. Big Huge Games were given access to the game's lore and allowed to develop the game they wanted based on it while the Amalur creators including Salvatore and McFarlane held executive roles in story and art design. The game used the same engine created by Big Huge Games for Rise of Nations, though it needed extensive adjustments to fit both the game's mechanics and its multiplatform status. They also incorporated Havok to handle the game's physics.

The aim from the project's outset was to create a game with engaging and "fun" combat, which was seen by the team as a rarity in the RPG genre. The game's AI, as described by producer Sean Bean, was designed to surround the player with a variety of enemy types and force a varied playstyle. The team also incorporated many random elements and optional unmarked content to give players a sense of freedom. Rolston spent much of the game's development playtesting, ensuring there were no serious bugs well before it was time to ship. When asked about including a jump option, Rolston explained it was left out except for contextual situations as it added little to exploration. The dungeons, which numbered over a hundred, were indivudually created by the team, with Frazier saying they were created through "brute force". The team used previous experience working on The Elder Scrolls III: Morrowind with guiding the player along the main quest line.

While Salvatore had created the world and history of Amalur, he had little direct involvement with the project. He was initially wary, but upon meeting Rolston's passion for the project, he was happy to leave it in their hands. The lead narrative designer was Erik J. Caponi, with additional work by Andrew Auseon and Tom Murphy. Frasier commented that the lack of a true lead character caused problems with the marketing, which instead focused on the world design and gameplay. Due to some production issues, the team ended up cutting a number of story cinematics, leaving the main quest's presentation lacking and relying on NPC-based story delivery similar to side quests. The dialogue system−carried over from the prototype−combined the menu-based style of the Elder Scrolls series, and a dialogue wheel made popular by BioWare in the Mass Effect series. Commenting on the game's take on his world design, Salvatore disliked the character names created by Big Huge Games, though he enjoyed the character Alyn. McFarlane, while not directly involved with development, was described as an executive art director who would check up on the team's work to ensure consistency. The in-game art assets were created with the game's engine limitations in mind, with art director Tim Coman described as leaning into a stylised and fantastical design.

Audio

The music was mainly composed by Grant Kirkhope, who had notably worked on mutliple games for British developer Rare. Reckoning was Kirkhope's first project working full-time in the United States, having left Rare to pursue a wider range of music jobs. He also opted for strong melodies which would only play once or twice during exploration rather than looping ambience. Kirkhope later described his approach on the game as taking it "a step at a time", writing some tracks such as the main theme early on and several others fairly late into production. The main theme was his first track for the game, with Kirkhope deciding on a large orchestral score to match its high fantasy setting. His first ambient track was the opening area of Dalentarth, which was the first in-game area to be completed. He drew direct inspiration from John Williams's work on the Harry Potter films, with the boss themes in particular being inspired by Williams's work.

The score was performed by the City of Prague Philharmonic Orchestra, with Nic Raine arranging and James Fitzpatrick producing. Raine and Fitzpatrick also acted as conductors. Different regions of the world had different instrumental elements in the lead, such as Dalentarth having a "wondrous element" emulating a dark fairy tale, and the open area called the Plains of Erethal focusing on strings. For the zone Alabastra, which had a large number of crystals, Kirkhope used a waterphone to add a "weird metallic sound". Alongside Kirkhope's work, tracks for the game's inns and taverns were composed and performed by Mark Cromer, who had previously worked on the Civilization series.

When choosing the extensive voice, the team both chose a variety of accents and ensured they would not clash with either each other or the Amalur setting. They also included a wide variety of character responses for non-essential characters, contrasting against other games including Elder Scrolls titles which had become notorious for repetitive dialogue. The voice work was described as "a huge management issue". It was estimated that the game had over 50,000 lines of voiced dialogue.

Release
The game project was confirmed in 2007 when production began at Big Huge Games. It was re-announced under its "Mercury" title in March 2010 at that year's Game Developer Conference. Its final title was announced in June 2010. As part of the game's promotion, a crossover was created with Mass Effect 3, with each demo unlocking themed in-game items in the other title. A game demo was released in January 2012, but met with criticism due to frequent bugs and lack of polish. Schilling apologised in a forum post, noting the demo was created by Electronic Arts using outdated code. A soundtrack album featuring Kirkhope's score was released on February 7, 2012.

Reckoning was published through February 2012; it released on February 7 in North America, February 9 in Australia, and February 10 in Europe. A number of special editions with different promotional items and collectables were created in limited supply, with the most expensive Signature Edition including items created or signed by the game's creative leads. The game was published in Japan by Spike Chunsoft on September 20. A sequel was in pre-production prior to 38 Studios's bankruptcy in 2012, which also led to the closure of Big Huge Games.

Downloadable content
When asked about DLC prior to release, Frasier noted that a menu option was included, but did not go into details on future plans. Pre-order DLC included special weapons and an item for finding option ingredients. Armor and weapon packs for the three skill groups were released individually alongside the game's launch. A free online pass was created for early runs of the console versions, and included with digital PC versions. The pass game with a quest series focused around the House of Valor Faction. In response to negative reactions online, 38 Studios stated the House of Valor was always intended as the game's first DLC.

The game's first expansion, Legend of Dead Kel, was released on March 20. The expansion, set on the isolated island Gallows End, included new dungeon types and enemy designs along with unique weapons and Twist of Fate cards. Auseon was lead narrative designer for Legend of Dead Kel. He described the Gravehal quest line included in the expansion as a "soft Faction" with similar mechanics and character interactions to Factions in the main game.

The second expansion, Teeth of Naros, was released on April 17. A new damage type dubbed "Primal" was added in the expansion, along with a new enemy type and enemy variants exclusive to Naros. For Teeth of Naros, Murphy took over as lead narrative designer. The team had wanted to raise the level cap, but unspecified logistical issues prevented this. Murphy recalled that it was challenging finding a suitable accent for the Kollossae, eventually settling on something comparable to "very light mid-Atlantic intonation" with post-processing to lower voices.

Kirkhope returned to create tracks for Legend of Dead Kel and Teeth of Naros, which he released through Bandcamp on March 1. All DLC, including pre-order items and the expansions, was included with the Japanese release. Due to the closure of Big Huge Games, planned console patches were cancelled, and a PC patch was released quickly to address major bugs and issues. While he was a fan and part of the modding community, Frazier noted prior to release that the game's engine could not accomodate user-created mods.

Reception

Over its first two months on sale, Reckoning sold over 400,000 copies not counting digital sales, a figure referred to by NPD Group as impressive. In the United Kingdom during its first week, the game reached the top of sales charts, surpassing the previous lead Final Fantasy XIII-2. By July 2012, the game had sold 1.3 million copies worldwide; while this surpassed Electronic Arts' sales projections, and was highlighted a contributor to the company's profits the first half of 2012. Despite this, it underperformed for 38 Studios, which had needed it sell over two million copies to turn a profit.

The game received "favorable" reviews on all platforms according to the review aggregation website Metacritic. The consensus among critics was generally positive, with many highlighting its gameplay and graphic design, but feeling it did little new to the genre.

The few reviews published before the release of the game were positive: IGN praised the game's customizable gameplay, gorgeous environments, and engrossing story, while criticizing the game for some minor technical issues. GameSpot praised the gameplay and visuals, but felt it was too generic.

After release, reviews were generally good but polarized, with a large difference between highest scores and lowest scores. GameTrailers said of the Xbox 360 version: "Though it leans a little too heavily on well-trod genre conventions, there's no denying that Reckoning has a whole lot to offer in terms of sheer breadth. Similarly, though the challenge tapers off dramatically toward the end, its combat is welcoming, gratifying, and hypnotic." Joystiq praised everything the same console version had to offer. Edge gave said console version six out of ten and felt that it did not reinvent anything, and had several issues, writing that "Reckonings appeal soon wanes" and that it "never quite balances accessibility with the depth expected from an RPG either." Digital Trends felt that said console version did not reinvent anything, but liked the combat system. GameZone gave the same Xbox 360 version 8.5 out of 10 and said it was "most definitely worthy of the hype it's been getting. If the Fable series had a baby with Skyrim, Reckoning might just be that end result—taking a little bit of gameplay mechanics from both, yet refining it into an extremely enjoyable, entertaining and challenging experience."

Digital Spy gave the PlayStation 3 version a score of all five stars, saying, "There's never a dull moment in Kingdoms of Amalur: Reckoning. There's a new item at practically every turn, and you can't travel more than a few feet without stumbling upon a side-quest. Players always have one skill or another that they can be honing, and the option to visit the Fateweavers is always there for a change of pace." The Guardian gave the PC version a similar score of all five stars and called it "a triumph that makes the prospect of a future MMO based on the same world and engine all the more enticing." The A.V. Club gave the Xbox 360 version a B+ and said, "There's nothing groundbreaking about Reckoning, but fans of The Elder Scrolls will still find a lot to love." The Escapist gave said console version four stars out of five and stated that "The weight of all its parts threatens to pull it down, but the rigid skeleton holds strong." The Digital Fix gave it a similar score of eight out of ten, saying that it was "a more than compotent introduction for a new IP. Flawed but filling the gap nicely between Skyrim and Mass Effect 3, gamers can be content in having a constant flow of RPG goodness. Hopefully this is just the beginning for the franchise as it is off to a fine start." In Japan, where the PS3 and Xbox 360 versions were ported and published by Spike Chunsoft on September 20, 2012, Famitsu gave both console versions each a score of one nine, two eights, and one nine for a total of 34 out of 40.

Re-Reckoning

Kingdoms of Amalur: Re-Reckoning is a remaster developed by Kaiko and published by THQ Nordic. Re-Reckoning was released for PlayStation 4, Windows and Xbox One on September 8, 2020. A Nintendo Switch port was released on March 16, 2021. Both versions included all previous DLC content, with the Switch version notably including all content on the game cartridge. Six software patches to address bugs and glitches were released between September 2020 and June 2021.

Assets and property rights for Reckoning and the rest of the Amalur property were sold to THQ Nordic in 2018, who later commented that a re-release of Reckoning required permission from co-publisher Electronic Arts. THQ Nordic executive Reinhard Pollice was a fan of the game, and hoped to bring it to prominence in the modern gaming market. Developer Kaiko had previously handled other THQ Nordic remasters including the first two Darksiders games. In addition to improving the game's graphics, the development team also wanted to improve the game's performance. After going through player feedback, it was also decided to rebalance the gameplay progression and loot distribution, and add a new higher difficulty level.

All versions of Re-Reckoning were given scores equating to "mixed or average" reviews from Metacritic. Jon Ryan of IGN felt that while still a solid game, several of its elements had aged over time and were outdated compared to more recent titles. RPG Sites Adam Vitale called Re-Reckoning "a good introduction to a universe that doesn't have any other entries", while PJ O'Reilly of Nintendo Life felt the game was both lacking in depth and showing its age. John Rairdin of Nintendo World Report called the game " an enthralling, though flawed, adventure that perfectly encapsulates a very specific era in game design history." The initial versions were criticised for technical issues not present in the original and a lack of graphical upgrades, while the Switch version was seen as a servicable port.

Fatesworn
Re-Reckoning saw an exclusive expansion titled Fatesworn. In the plot of Fatesworn, the Order of Fateweavers reveals that the Fateless One's actions have damaged the Fate Weave and allowed the chaos god Telogrus to begin attacking the Faelands. Travelling to the island of Mithros, the Fateless One partners with Agarth and former master smith Skald Atlas against Telogrus and his cult. After banishing Telogrus, who had possessed Skald's apprentice Wulf, the Order of Fateweavers insists the Fateless One leave the Faelands forever to allow the Fate Weave to heal. They are seen off by Hughes, Agarth and Alyn, with a final narration by Alyn revealing that the Faelands recovered and the Fateless One never returned.

Kaiko were described as enthusiastic about its development, consulting with former staff members about its design. Auseon returned as lead writer and narrative designer, while Kirkhope was brought back to compose new music. The expansion was described as being mostly new, though it used "loose ideas that [the team] picked up" from the original development. The team needed to create new editing tools and production pipeline, with these and working with the existing game environment causing production delays with the expansion.

The expansion was released on December 14, 2021 for PS4, Xbox One and Windows. An arena mode tied to the expansion was released on December 23, unlocking exclusive rewards and challenge fights. The Switch version was delayed from its original 2022 release due to quality concerns, eventually releasing on March 12, 2023. Reviewing the PS4 release, Robert Ramsey of Push Square called Fatesworn "a genuine homage to a game that would have been undeservedly forgotten", praising its addition but faulting its side quest structure.

References

External links
 
 
 
 

2012 video games
Action role-playing video games
Big Huge Games games
Electronic Arts games
Fantasy video games
Hack and slash role-playing games
Open-world video games
Nintendo Switch games
PlayStation 3 games
PlayStation 4 games
Role-playing video games
Single-player video games
THQ Nordic games
Video games featuring protagonists of selectable gender
Video games scored by Grant Kirkhope
Video games using Havok
Video games with customizable avatars
Video games developed in the United States
Video games with downloadable content
Windows games
Xbox 360 games
Xbox One games